Italian manufacturer VM Motori has designed and built several different diesel engines for many third-party applications. Since 2013 Fiat and its successors own VM Motori and sell projects to automotive manufacturers including GM, Jeep, and other companies. VM Motori offers different range of engines depending on the applications: automotive, industrial, marine, and power generation.

Automotive applications

3 Cylinder

R 315 SOHC
1.5 L I3, with a single overhead camshaft, four valves-per-cylinder, and common-rail direct fuel injection.

This engine was designed in 1998 with the related 4-cylinder variant R 420 SOHC. In 1999, VM granted Hyundai the license to manufacture both engines. Under terms of the agreement, Hyundai was able to manufacture the engines only to power its vehicles, while VM was free to grant other license agreements also in Korea, as happened in 2004 with GM Daewoo.

Further evolutions were named RA 315 (Euro 4 compliant, up to  ) and A 315 (Euro 5 compliant, up to  ).

Applications:

 Hyundai Accent (power: 90 hp (60 kW); torque: 133 lb·ft(180 N m))
 Hyundai Matrix (power: 90 hp (60 kW); torque: 133 lb·ft(180 N m))
 Hyundai Getz (power: 90 hp (60 kW); torque: 133 lb·ft(180 N m))k

HR 392 SOHC
 bore and stroke,  straight-three engine, of an OHV pushrod design with two valves per cylinder. The block was cast iron, with an alloy head. It featured a four main bearing crankshaft, a balance shaft, and a Bosch VE3/10 fuel injection pump. A KKK 14 turbocharger was used, with an intercooler for the facelifted 'Nuova 33' of 1990.
Although out of production, this was the biggest three-cylinder engine ever made for a car.

Applications:

RA 325

  at 4000 rpm  1900-2700 RPm.
 Hyundai Matrix
 Hyundai Getz
 Hyundai Accent

4 Cylinder

RA 420 SOHC
 straight-4, with four valves-per-cylinder and common-rail direct fuel injection. Produced by GM Korea and Hyundai Group (Hyundai and Kia).

Applications:
 Chevrolet Cruze, power: , torque: 
 Daewoo Lacetti/Daewoo Nubira II/Chevrolet Optra, power: , torque: 
 Daewoo Tosca/Chevrolet Epica, power: , torque: 
 Daewoo Winstorm/Chevrolet Captiva, power: , torque: , engine code: Z 20 S1.
 Hyundai Elantra XD, power: ; torque: 
 Hyundai i30 FD, power: ; torque:  (pre-facelift models)
 Hyundai Sonata NF, power:  (pre-facelift models) /  (facelift models); torque: 
 Hyundai Tucson JM, power: ,  or  depending on model year; torque:  or 
 Hyundai Santa Fe SM, power: ; torque: 
 Hyundai Trajet, power: ; torque: 
 Kia Cerato/Spectra LD, power: ; torque: 
 Kia cee'd ED, power: ; torque: 
 Kia Carens FC, power: ; torque: 
 Kia Carens UN, power: ; torque: 
 Kia Sportage JE, power ,  or  depending on model year; torque:  or 
 Opel Antara, power: , torque:  - called Z20DM/DMH by Opel

HR 488 OHV
 straight-4, with two (pushrod-actuated) valves-per-cylinder and indirect injection from Bosch (Spica in earlier versions). . This engine, developed for Alfa Romeo in 1979, is also known as the VM80A and VM4 HT. Usually with KKK 16 turbochargers.

Applications:

HR 492 OHV
 straight-4, with two (pushrod-actuated) valves-per-cylinder and indirect fuel injection (Bosch VE 4/10, Spica in some earlier applications). . This engine is also known as the VM81A and VM4 HT 2.4. At first the 2.4 used KKK 24 turbochargers, later KKK 16s were installed for higher output.

Applications:
 1984 Delta Mini Cruiser/Explorer,  at 4,200 rpm
 1986-?

425 OHV

 straight-four, with two (pushrod-actuated) valves-per-cylinder and indirect fuel injection. , the engine size is variably referred to as either 2,500 or 2,499 cc. This engine too has been called HR 492, signifying four cylinders of  bore. Timing gears, not belt.

Applications:
 1991–2000 Chrysler Voyager,  and 
 1999–2001 Dodge Dakota (Brazil),  and 
 1991-1995 Dodge Caravan C/V (U.S. fleets only),  and 
 1993-1999 Ford Scorpio 
 1996–2000 GAZ GAZelle, ; torque: 
 1995–1998 Jeep Grand Cherokee,  and 
 1997–2000 UAZ 3160,  and 
This engine was also used in some early Toyota Land Cruisers & Hilux, and Opel Fronteras.

The 425 OHV used in Chrysler Voyager 1991–2000 only 1996 and 1997 was with chain.

Between 1997 and 2001 this engine was manufactured at "Detroit Diesel Motores do Brasil" in Curitiba, Paraná, Brazil. The plant was eventually sold to Perkins after the Dodge Dakota stopped production locally.

R 425 OHV

425 OHV fitted with direct fuel injection for cleaner emissions.

Applications:  Rover 800 late models circa 1998

R 425 DOHC

 straight-4, with four valves-per-cylinder and common-rail direct fuel injection.

Applications:
 2001–2007 Chrysler Voyager Manual power: ; torque: 
 2002–2004 Jeep Liberty power: ; torque: 
 2005-2009 LDV Maxus
 2011-present SAIC Maxus V80
 power:  at 4,000 rpm; torque:  at 2,000 rpm
 2012 Zhongxing Landmark
 2012–present, Holden Colorado, Chevrolet Colorado 
 power: ; Torque: 380 N⋅m (280 lb⋅ft) Duramax LKH (Thai production) 
 power: ; Torque: 439 N⋅m (324 lb⋅ft) Duramax XLDE25 LP2 (Thai production)

A derated version of this engine putting out  was chosen in 2006 to power the new generation of the iconic London Taxi (the TX4).

R 428 DOHC 

R 425 DOHC enlarged to  displacement.

Applications:
 2001–2007 Chrysler Voyager (Automatic transmission) power: ; torque: 
 2001–2004 Jeep Cherokee/Liberty power: ; torque: . Only in Europe
 2005–2006 Jeep Liberty power: ; torque: 
 2004–present BMC Megastar power: ; torque: 
 2012-2013 Chevrolet Colorado & Holden Colorado & Nova S10(Brazil) (Manual and Automatic)  Torque

RA 428 DOHC
Evolution of R 428 DOHC. Base design for SDEC SC28R engine.

Applications:
 2008–2010 Jeep Liberty power: ; torque: 
 2007–2010 Dodge Nitro power: ; torque: 
 2007–2010 Jeep Wrangler power: ; torque: Manual transmission:  automatic transmission: 
 2008–2011 Chrysler Grand Voyager (Automatic transmission) power: ; torque: 
 2016–present Maxus/LDV T60 (SC28R engine) (Automatic & Manual transmission) power: ; torque:

A 428 DOHC

Evolution of R428 DOHC with  common rail injection system and piezoelectric injectors

Applications:
 2010–2012 Jeep Cherokee power: ; torque: Manual transmission:  automatic transmission: 
 2010–2018 Jeep Wrangler power: ; torque: Manual transmission:  automatic transmission: 
 2011–2013 Chrysler Grand Voyager/Lancia Voyager power: ; torque: 
 2013–2016 Chrysler Grand Voyager/Lancia Voyager power: ; torque: 
 2013 Holden Colorado, Holden Colorado 7 power ;  (Updated November 2013)
 2014–present, Holden Colorado, Chevrolet Colorado power:  Torque: 
 2017–present, Chevrolet Express 2500 & 3500 vans. Power: 181 hp @ 3,400rpm and 369 lb-ft @ 2,000 rpm

R 754

5 Cylinder

HR 588 OHV
 inline-5, with two (pushrod-actuated) valves-per-cylinder and indirect fuel injection from either Bosch or Spica. . This engine is a five-cylinder version of the 2-litre HR488, and also uses KKK turbochargers.

Applications:
 1987-?

531 OHV

Essentially a 425 OHV with an extra cylinder.  Straight-5, with two (pushrod-actuated) valves-per-cylinder and indirect fuel injection.

Applications:
 1999–2001 Jeep Grand Cherokee power: ; torque:

R 531 OHV

531 OHV I5 engine, fitted with direct fuel injection.

Applications:

6 Cylinder

638 OHV

Essentially a 531 OHV with an extra cylinder.  inline-six, with two (pushrod-actuated) valves-per-cylinder and indirect fuel injection.

Applications:
 1995–1999 Asia Motors Combi power: ; torque: 
 1995–2000 Bucher-Guyer Duro power: ; torque: 
 1999 Bering trucks power: ; torque: 
Also used by BMW Marine as a  stern-drive package.

R 638 OHV

638 OHV fitted with direct fuel injection.

Applications:

D 642 OHV

Essentially an R 638 OHV enlarged to  displacement. It was the first VM Motori engine to feature direct fuel injection.

Applications:
 2001–2002 Bucher-Guyer Duro power: ; torque:

RA 629 DOHC

A planned  double overhead camshaft V6 engine, featuring four valves-per-cylinder and common-rail direct fuel injection.

Developed for General Motors but stopped at the end of 2008; after Cadillac left the European market and Saab was put for sale, GM had no use for that engine.

A 630 DOHC

A  double overhead camshaft V6 engine, featuring four valves-per-cylinder and common-rail direct fuel injection. A variant complying with the emission norms of the North America market (NAFTA) is the L630 DOHC and marketed by Fiat Chrysler as the EcoDiesel. The high-performance, single turbo version is codenamed as A630 DOHC HP.

A630 applications (Europe)
 2011 Jeep Grand Cherokee (Also Australia)
 power , torque 
 2012 Chrysler 300 /Lancia Thema (Europe)
 power  @ 4000 rpm, torque  @ 1600-2800 rpm
 power  @ 4000 rpm, torque  @ 1800-2800 rpm
 2014 Jeep Grand Cherokee (FPT Multijet II)
 power  @ 4000 rpm, torque   @ 2000 rpm

L630 applications (North America)
 2014-2017 Jeep Grand Cherokee Branded as EcoDiesel
 power  @ 3600 rpm, torque   @ 2000 rpm
 2014-2019 Ram 1500 Branded as EcoDiesel
 power  @ 3600 rpm, torque   @ 2000 rpm

A630 HP applications (Europe)
 2013 Maserati Ghibli III
 power  @ 4000 rpm, torque  @ 2000 rpm
2013 Maserati Quattroporte VI
 power  @ 4000 rpm, torque  @ 2000-2600 rpm
2016 Maserati Levante
 power  @ 4000 rpm, torque  @ 2000-2600 rpm
 power  @ 4000 rpm, torque  @ 2000-2600 rpm

See also
 List of engines used in Chrysler products

Other vehicles which used VM Motori engines in some models
AMC Eagle
ARO 24 Series
Chevrolet Colorado Diesel only.
Ford Scorpio
Fiat Croma
Isuzu D-Max
Jeep Wrangler
Opel Frontera
Range Rover Turbo D
Toyota Hilux (2.4D)
Toyota Land Cruiser

References

VM Motori
V6 engines